Talor Gooch (born November 14, 1991) is an American professional golfer.

Early life and amateur career
Gooch was born in Midwest City, Oklahoma. He played college golf at Oklahoma State University. He was already drawing notice for his talent as a six-year-old. His father, Ron Gooch, played minor league professional baseball in the Texas Rangers organization.

Professional career
Gooch played on the PGA Tour Canada in 2015 and 2016. His best finish was second at the 2015 Syncrude Boreal Open. In December 2016, he tied for 23rd place in the Web.com Tour qualifying tournament to earn a place on the Web.com Tour in 2017. In August 2017, he won the News Sentinel Open. He finished sixth on the regular season money list to earn his PGA Tour card.

On the 2017-18 PGA Tour, Gooch made 12 cuts in 27 events with a best finish of T13 at the Wells Fargo Championship. He finished 139th on the FedEx Cup points list to retain conditional status for the following season. He had two top-5 finishes early in the 2018–19 season and finished 101st on the FedEx Cup points list.

In November 2021, Gooch won his first PGA Tour event at the RSM Classic in Sea Island, Georgia. Gooch shot a final round 6-under-par 64 to win by three strokes.

2022: LIV Golf
Gooch joined the Saudi-backed LIV Golf Invitational Series in May 2022. Gooch placed 9th in the LIV Golf London at Centurion Club, earning him $580,000. Gooch also was a member of the 4 Aces team at Portland. In an interview after the event, Gooch compared the event to Ryder Cup and President's Cup events.

Amateur wins
2012 Oklahoma Stroke Play

Source:

Professional wins (2)

PGA Tour wins (1)

Web.com Tour wins (1)

Results in major championships
Results not in chronological order in 2020.

CUT = missed the half-way cut

NT = No tournament due to COVID-19 pandemic

Results in The Players Championship

CUT = missed the halfway cut
"T" indicates a tie for a place
C = Canceled after the first round due to the COVID-19 pandemic

Results in World Golf Championships

1Canceled due to COVID-19 pandemic

"T" = Tied
NT = No tournament
Note that the Championship and Invitational were discontinued from 2022.

See also
2017 Web.com Tour Finals graduates

References

External links
 
 

American male golfers
Oklahoma State Cowboys golfers
PGA Tour golfers
LIV Golf players
Korn Ferry Tour graduates
Golfers from Oklahoma
People from Midwest City, Oklahoma
1991 births
Living people